E 551 is a European B class road in Czech Republic, connecting the cities České Budějovice — Humpolec

Route and E-road junctions 
  (on shared signage  I 34)
 České Budějovice:  , 
 Humpolec:

External links 
 UN Economic Commission for Europe: Overall Map of E-road Network (2007)
 International E-road network

International E-road network
Roads in the Czech Republic